Littleton–Mineral station (sometimes styled as Littleton•Mineral) is a RTD light rail station in Littleton, Colorado, United States. Operating as part of the D Line, the station was opened on July 14, 2000, and is operated by the Regional Transportation District. Presently this serves as the southern terminus for the D Line; however, RTD plans to extend this line south to Highlands Ranch.

References 

RTD light rail stations
Littleton, Colorado
Railway stations in the United States opened in 2000